is a Japanese voice actor. He was born in Tokyo, and is often featured on Japanese anime television network Animax as narrator along with fellow voice actor Yukari Tamura.

Filmography

Television animation
Asuka Jr. in Saint Tail (1995)
Maeno in Ping-Pong Club (1995)
Recca Hanabishi in Flame of Recca (1997)
Kuki Jr. in Grander Musashi RV (1998)
Kaname Takasato, Aozaru in Twelve Kingdoms (2002)
Usop, Vincent in Midnight Horror School (2002)
Hot Rod(Hot Shot) in Transformers: Armada (2003)
Sokan Watabe in Sensei no Ojikan (2004)
Yashima-sama in Kamichu (2005)
Mahiro Atori in Hiiro no Kakera (2012)
Cameramon in Digimon Universe: Appli Monsters (2016)

Unknown date 

Taichi Miyamoto in Bleach
Haguruma in Boruto: Naruto Next Generations
Tsukado in Naruto Shippuden
Russell Tringum in Fullmetal Alchemist
Noboru Yoshikawa in Great Teacher Onizuka
Kenta Nakamura in Initial D
Daisuke Hayami in Rockman EXE
Hotshot in Transformers Animated
Rikichi Yamada in Nintama Rantarou
Current Okeanos in Saint Seiya Episode.G drama CDs
Yusaku Tsunemura in Baka and Test (second season)

Original video animation
Captain Tsubasa: Holland Youth (1994) (Makoto Soda)
Yamato 2520 (1995) (Carl)
Sokan Watabe in Sensei no Ojikan

Theatrical animation
Crayon Shin-chan: The Storm Called: The Adult Empire Strikes Back (2001) (A sake dealer)

Video games
Metalman and Shadowman in Super Adventure Rockman (1998)
Reiji Azuma/ Zwei in Phantom of Inferno (2000)
Werner Blues (Brett Varner) in Growlanser II: The Sense of Justice (2001)
Mahiro Atori in Hiiro no Kakera (2006)
PlayStation Move Heroes (2011) (Lunk)

Drama CDs
Abunai series 2: Abunai Summer Vacation (????)
Baito wa Maid!? (????) (Yuuya Tamura)
Daisuki (????) (Yoshida)
GENE Tenshi wa Sakareru (????) (Arche Yan)
Kageki series 5: Kageki ni Tengoku (????) (angel 3)
Last Order (????) (Yoshihiro Shiho)
Naguru Hakui no Tenshi (????) (Tomoki Igarashi)
Rijichou-sama no Okiniiri (????) (Rentarou Kashiwagi)
Romantist Taste (????) (Kazuma Ehara)

Dubbing

Live-action
The Faculty (Casey Connor (Elijah Wood))
The Hangover Part II (Leslie Chow (Ken Jeong))
The Hangover Part III (Leslie Chow (Ken Jeong))
Monkeybone (Herb (Dave Foley))
Mr. & Mrs. Smith (2008 NTV edition) (Benjamin "The Tank" Danz (Adam Brody))
The O.C. (Seth Cohen (Adam Brody))
Power Rangers In Space (Seymour)
Power Rangers Mystic Force (Xander Bly/Green Mystic Ranger (Richard Brancatisano))
Power Rangers Samurai (Negatron)
The Quick and the Dead (1997 TV Asahi edition) (Fee 'The Kid' Herod (Leonardo DiCaprio))
Road Trip (Barry Manilow (Tom Green))
Scooby-Doo (Scrappy Doo (Scott Innes))
White Squall (Shay Jennings (Jason Marsden))

Animation
Atomic Betty (Sparky)
Courage the Cowardly Dog (The Nowhere Newsman & Di-Lung)
Dexter's Laboratory (Major Glory)
Oscar's Oasis (Suricates)
Recess (Butch)
Spider-Man (Cletus Kasady/Carnage)

References

External links
 
 

Animax
1969 births
Living people
People from Tokyo
Japanese male voice actors